Steinert is a surname. Notable people with the surname include:

Damián Steinert (born 1986), Argentine football winger
Kristin Steinert (born 1987), German bobsledder
Otto Steinert (1915–1978), German photographer
Scott Steinert (1962–1997), American gangster
Vida Steinert (1903/5–1976), New Zealand painter
Wolfgang Steinert (1940–2010), German electrical engineer
Hans Gustav Wilhelm Steinert (1875–1911), German physician who first described Myotonic dystrophy, also known as Curschmann-Batten-Steinert syndrome

See also
Steinert High School, four year comprehensive public high school in Hamilton Township in Mercer County, New Jersey, United States
Steinert Pianos, a Boston-based company which became known for a manufacturing cooperation with Steinway & Sons and production of grands acc. to Steinway designs.
Steinert Hall, a concert auditorium developed by the above company